The Open eXchange Data Format, or OpenXDF, is an open, XML-based standard for the digital storage and exchange of time-series physiological signals and metadata. OpenXDF primarily focuses on electroencephalography and polysomnography.

History 
Neurotronics began work on OpenXDF in 2003 with the goal of providing a modern, open, and extensible file format with which clinicians and researchers can share physiological data and metadata, such as signal data, signal montages, patient demographics, and event logs.

Neurotronics released the first draft of the OpenXDF Specification just before the 18th meeting of the Associated Professional Sleep Societies in 2004.  Neurotronics has since relinquished control of the format to the OpenXDF Consortium.

As of version 1.0, OpenXDF is 100% backward compatible with the European Data Format (EDF), the current de facto standard format for physiological data exchange.

Features

Tiered structure 
OpenXDF is a tiered framework designed to allow standardized and custom specializations of the format while enforcing a common foundation that provides a high-level of compatibility between unrelated systems.

Metadata 
OpenXDF expands on EDF by providing standardized support for extensive patient information, display montages, annotations, and scoring information.

Unicode support 
OpenXDF requires the use of a XML 1.0 compliant parser that supports UTF-8 and UTF-16.

Signal configuration 
OpenXDF supports fully and independently configurable data signals.  Each signal specifies its byte order, whether its samples are signed, the size of its samples, and its sampling rate.

Security 
OpenXDF supports encryption of the XML file using TwoFish in Cipher Feedback (CFB) mode with a 256-bit key created from a UTF-8 encoded password hashed with SHA-256.  In addition, OpenXDF supports integrity verification using a SHA-512 hash of the original XML file.

See also 
 European Data Format (EDF)

References 

OpenXDF Web Site
OpenXDF Specification

External links 
 European Data Format (EDF) Specifications

Electroencephalography
Industry-specific XML-based standards